Micaiah may refer to any of these:

People
 Micaiah, the son of Imlah
 Micaiah Towgood, an author
 Micaiah Diondae "Dion" Glover, an American professional basketball player
 Michaiah Shobek (born James Michael Shoffner), American serial killer

Fictional characters
 Micaiah (Fire Emblem), one of the main characters in Fire Emblem: Radiant Dawn

See also 
 Micajah
 Micah (disambiguation)